Thomas George Syred was an English professional association footballer who played as a winger. He played a total of nine matches in the Football League and scored one goal.

References

People from Gillingham, Kent
English footballers
Association football wingers
Burnley F.C. players
Gillingham F.C. players
English Football League players
Year of birth missing
Year of death missing